The Journal of Spacecraft and Rockets is a bi-monthly (six issues per year) peer-reviewed scientific journal published by the American Institute of Aeronautics and Astronautics. It covers the science and technology of spaceflight, satellite and mission design, missile design, and rockets. The editor-in-chief is Olivier de Weck (Massachusetts Institute of Technology). It was established in 1964.

Abstracting and indexing
The journal is abstracted and indexed in:

According to the Journal Citation Reports, the journal has a 2021 impact factor of 1.808.

History
The journal was published bimonthly from the beginning. Prior editors have been:
 Hanspeter Schaub (2017 - 2021)
 Robert D. Braun (2014 - 2016)
 E. Vincent Zoby (1993 - 2014)
 Clark H. Lewis (1990 - 1993)
 Frank J. Redd (1987 - 1989)
 R.H. Woodward Waesche (1981 - 1987)
 Paul F. Holloway (1978 - 1981)
 Donald C. Fraser (1975 - 1978)
 Ralph R. Ragan (1972 - 1975)
 Gordon L. Dugger (1964 - 1971) - founding editor

References

External links

Aerospace engineering journals
English-language journals
Bimonthly journals
Publications established in 1964